The Rio Negro gnatcatcher (Polioptila facilis) is a species of bird in the family Polioptilidae. It is endemic to Brazil.

Taxonomy and systematics

The Rio Negro gnatcatcher is monotypic. It was formerly treated as a subspecies of the Guianan gnatcatcher (Polioptila guianensis) but since mid-2019 has been considered a separate species based on significant differences in morphology and vocalization.

Description

The male's head, breast, and back are bluish gray and its belly white with minimal contrast between the two colors. The innermost feathers of its tail are black and the outermost white, with those between intergrading. The female is similar but paler.

Distribution and habitat

The Rio Negro gnatcatcher is found in northern Amazonas state in Brazil and the immediately adjacent parts of southern Venezuela and eastern Colombia. Much of its range is drained by the Rio Negro, a blackwater tributary of the Amazon River. It inhabits the borders and canopy of humid primary forest, mostly below  elevation.

Behavior

Feeding

The Rio Negro gnatcatcher's diet is little known but is assumed to be arthropods like that of other Polioptila gnatcatchers. It actively forages, usually as part of mixed-species flocks.

Breeding

The Rio Negro gnatcatcher's breeding phenology has not been documented.

Vocalization

The Rio Negro gnatcatcher's song is repeated high notes .

Status

The IUCN has not assessed the Rio Negro gnatcatcher. "The species’ ecoregion of primary occurrence...[is] not considered to be at any serious risk".

References

Polioptila
Birds described in 1942
Taxa named by John T. Zimmer